Macedonski (rarely spelled Macedonschi or Macedonsky) is a toponymic surname, derived from Macedonia. It may refer to:
 Hristo Makedonski, Bulgarian revolutionary leader.
 Alexandru Macedonski, Romanian writer.
 Dimitrie Macedonski, Wallachian revolutionary leader.
 Pavel Macedonski, Wallachian pandur, brother of Dimitrie. 
 Alexandru D. Macedonski, Romanian army general, son of Dimitrie Macedonski, father of Alexandru.
 Alexis Macedonski, Romanian painter, son of Alexandru Macedonski.
 Soare Macedonski, Romanian painter, son of Alexis Macedonski.

Romanian-language surnames
Slavic-language surnames
Bulgarian-language surnames
Toponymic surnames
Ethnonymic surnames